Rowe Point is a sharp, low ice-free point at the northeastern extremity of Ivanov Beach on the southeast coast of Barclay Bay in western Livingston Island in the South Shetland Islands, Antarctica. Mneme Lake is just west of the point.

The feature is part of the Antarctic Specially Protected Area ASPA 126 Byers Peninsula, in one of its restricted zones.

The point is named after Captain Henry Rowe, Master of the British sealing vessel Grace that operated out of the bay of New Plymouth, Livingston Island, in 1821–22.

Location

Maps
 Península Byers, Isla Livingston. Mapa topográfico a escala 1:25000. Madrid: Servicio Geográfico del Ejército, 1992. (Map image on p. 55 of the linked study)
 L.L. Ivanov et al. Antarctica: Livingston Island and Greenwich Island, South Shetland Islands. Scale 1:100000 topographic map. Sofia: Antarctic Place-names Commission of Bulgaria, 2005.
 L.L. Ivanov. Antarctica: Livingston Island and Greenwich, Robert, Snow and Smith Islands. Scale 1:120000 topographic map. Troyan: Manfred Wörner Foundation, 2009.

Notes

References
 Rowe Point. SCAR Composite Antarctic Gazetteer

Headlands of Livingston Island